Gerald Hugh Ramsey (a.k.a. Jay Ramsey) is an American singer, songwriter, musician, and performer. As a recording artist in the 1950s, 1960s, and 1970s, Ramsey had releases on several record labels including United Artist Records, Reprise Records, Casablanca Records, ABC Records and Hanover Records. His songs have been recorded by popular artists including Elvis Presley, Conway Twitty, Roy Clark, Johnny Tillotson, and Billy Mize. His song "We Can Make the Morning" was included on Presley's 1972 Gold award-winning album Elvis Now on RCA Records.

Biography 
Ramsey grew up in Sanger, Texas and attended Sanger High School. When he was 14 years old his parents took him to donate used clothing to an orphanage and while there he noticed his father's previously donated guitar sitting against a wall in the director's office. He asked the director about the guitar and was told he could take it home. After one lesson from his father, he taught himself to play. Ramsey began writing songs at the age of 16 and began performing in a band while in high school. He attended college at the University of North Texas in Denton, Texas. In 1962 he married Joan Speck of Celina, Texas and together they have two daughters. Ramsey and Speck have since divorced.

Recording career 
In high school, Ramsey was a member of the Denton, Texas group Kids from Texas. The band was signed to New York City label Hanover Records in 1958 and released the single, "Long Legged Linda" b/w the Gerald H. Ramsey song "I'm So Lonely" (Hanover Records release #4500).

In the early 1960s, Ramsey met WRR Dallas disc jockey Bob Kelly at Kelly's Dallas recording studio, Top Ten Recording Studio. Kelly was a well known disc jockey at Dallas radio station WRR, a record producer, and recording engineer. In 1962 Ramsey's first single "Smooth Talking Woman" b/w "Look Away Love" was released on Kelly's record label, Libra Records, under the name Jay Ramsey & The Contempos (Libra release #B.K-1001)

In 1963, Ramsey, Bob Kelly, Frank Cole, and Jerry Brown formed the band, The Expressions. The group released a single with Chicago-based Smash Records, a subsidiary of Mercury Records. Ramsey's song "Thrill" was the A-side b/w "Come Back Karen" which was written by the band (Smash Records release #S-1848). The single had no chart success.

In 1965, The Expressions were signed by Reprise Records. Reprise released a single with two of Ramsey's songs "One Plus One" b/w "Playboy" (Reprise Records #0360).  In 1965, they became a 5 piece self contained band by adding Kirby St. Romain.  The five members then performed and recorded together with no personnel changes for over 10 years.

By 1968 the band had changed its name to Expression and in 1971 they recorded an album for Mediarts Records entitled "Texas/Nevada Border" (Mediarts Records release #41-9). The label released the single "California is Just Mississippi" b/w "Let Us Pray" (Mediarts Records release #ME-104). The song made it to the top ten in several major markets, but never charted nationally. This single was also released in Germany by United Artists Records (United Artists #35 250).

Major label success 
In the 1970s, Jay signed with Surety Songs and Blue Crest Music (both Nashville publishing companies) and worked for a while as a full-time songwriter.

In 1971, Kenny Price recorded Ramsey's song "Tonopah Highway" on his RCA Records album The Sheriff of Boone County (LSP-4527).

In 1972, Ramsey's song "We Can Make The Morning" was included in Elvis Presley's famed album  Elvis Now. Ramsey's song "We Can Make the Morning" was also included on the only single from the album, "Until It's Time for You to Go" / "We Can Make The Morning" (RCA release #2188).  The album Elvis Now achieved Gold status from the Recording Industry's Association of America (RIAA). The single "Until It's Time for You to Go"/"We Can Make the Morning" reached number 9 on the Adult Contemporary Chart in the US and number 5 on the UK Singles Chart.

Also in 1972, Ramsey's song "Lord, Let It Rain" was recorded by Roy Clark and released on Dot Records album Roy Clark Country! (DOS-#25997) Clark's album peaked at number 10 on the US Country charts and number 112 on the US charts.

In 1973, Billy Mize released a single of Ramsey's song "California is Just Mississippi" with United Artists Records (UA-XW265-W) which reached number 99 on the Country Music charts.

In 1973, Ramsey released the single, "Draggin' Chains' b/w "The Saddest Song" (both Ramsey compositions) on ABC Records (ABC-#11385).  In 1979, Conway Twitty recorded  "Draggin' Chains" and another of Ramsey's songs, "If You Can't Write the Music," for his MCA Records album Cross Winds (MCA-3086). Cross Winds peaked at number 11 and spent 26 weeks on the Top Country Albums chart. "Draggin' Chains" was also released on Conway Twitty's single "Don't Take it Away" b/w "Draggin Chains"  (MCA-41002). This single peaked at number 12 on the US Country Music charts and number 15 on the Canada Country Music charts.

In 1974, Billy Mize also recorded Ramsey's "Lord Let It Rain" for United Artists (UA-XW503-X).

In 1975, Ramsey recorded his songs on the single "Smokey Mountain Cowboy" b/w "Sunshine In My Morning" (NB-820) with Casablanca Records.  "Smokey Mountain Cowboy" charted at number one on WKDA radio in Nashville.  In 1977, Johnny Tillotson recorded Ramsey's song "Sunshine in My Morning" for his album Johnny Tillotson released by United Artists Records (UA-LA758-G).

Live performance 
By 1964 The Expressions began touring nationally. The band toured for 16 years, playing the Playboy Club circuit and other venues throughout the continental US and Canada.  By 1968 they were known simply as Expression and had become regulars in the Nevada casino circuit.

In 1982, Ramsey formed the Jay Ramsey Band. They performed together for 18 years. In recent years, a new Jay Ramsey Band has been formed, and he continues to perform in Texas and Las Vegas with his long-time friend and fellow founding member of The Expressions, Jerry Brown.  Ramsey currently lives in Las Vegas.  He was inducted into the Las Vegas Entertainers Hall Of Fame in 2017.

TV, film and advertising 
In 2008, Ramsey signed many of his songs and recordings from the 1960s and 1970s to Fervor Records. The label has placed many of his songs in popular films and television shows, and have released much of his previously unreleased material.

Discography

TV, film, and advertising 

− Source:

References

Further reading
  
  

ABC Records artists
American pop musicians
Casablanca Records artists
Living people
Musicians from Texas
People from Sanger, Texas
Reprise Records artists
Songwriters from Texas
United Artists Records artists
Year of birth missing (living people)
20th-century American singers